is a Japanese professional golfer.

Career
Oda was born in Tagawa, Fukuoka. He turned professional in 2000.

Oda won the 2008 Casio World Open and the 2009 Token Homemate Cup. He competed in the 2009 Open Championship at Turnberry, but failed to make the cut, finishing day two at 14 over par. He retained the Casio World Open in 2009 and the Token Homemate Cup in 2010. In 2011, he won the Diamond Cup Golf for his fifth Japan Golf Tour win. In September 2013, Oda won the ANA Open, the victory was his sixth on the Japan Golf Tour. In May 2014, Oda won the Kansai Open Golf Championship for his seventh Japan Golf Tour win. He would follow with his eighth victory on tour later that year in October, when he won the Bridgestone Open.

Professional wins (8)

Japan Golf Tour wins (8)

Japan Golf Tour playoff record (2–1)

Results in major championships

CUT = missed the half-way cut
"T" = tied

Results in World Golf Championships
Results not in chronological order before 2015.

"T" = Tied

Team appearances
Royal Trophy (representing Asia): 2010
EurAsia Cup (representing Asia): 2014

References

External links

Japanese male golfers
Japan Golf Tour golfers
Sportspeople from Fukuoka Prefecture
People from Tagawa, Fukuoka
1978 births
Living people